Meriton is an Australian property developer and construction company  founded by Harry Triguboff AO, its managing director, in 1963. Meriton sells apartments and also operates serviced apartments accommodation under its Meriton Suites brand in Sydney, Brisbane and the Gold Coast.

In 2007, it was estimated the company was building about 1,200 apartments each year.  By 2010 this figure had increased to 2,000 units. It is estimated that over the past 50 years, Meriton has built more than 65,000 residential apartments on the east coast of Australia. It also offers serviced accommodation in 17 locations.

On 13 November 2013, Meriton celebrated its 50th anniversary with a party on Sydney Harbour for more than 300 current and former employees, friends, family and dignitaries from the political and business world.

2014 was a record year for the apartment developer, with the company's annual turnover rising more than 50 per cent to $2 billion, bringing it to 11th place in IBISWorld's 2014 Top 500 Companies, up from 29th spot the previous year. The HIA-Colorbond steel Housing 100 named Meriton as Australia's largest residential home builder, up more than 5000 housing starts, from 2573 in FY2013-14 to 7929. Based on this figure, new homes by Meriton accounted for around 10 per cent of all multi-unit dwellings commenced in Australia, and 29.5 per cent of all multi-unit dwellings commenced in New South Wales. Meriton projects equated to approximately 0.05 per cent of Australia's GDP.

Meriton has about 15,000 apartments in its development pipeline. In recent years, Meriton has shifted focus to providing retail, recreational and childcare facilities alongside residential and serviced apartments.

In July 2018, Meriton was fined $3 million for manipulating TripAdvisor reviews.

History 

Meriton got its start after a young Harry Triguboff built his first home in Roseville, Sydney, in 1960; the builder he'd hired let him down so he completed the job himself and developed a taste for construction. He then took on an eight-block apartment project in Tempe in 1963 with just three staff: the apartments sold for $9,750 each, and the car space was an extra $500.

In 1969, he built a development of 18 apartments in Meriton Street, Gladesville, which gave rise to the company name.

'High-Rise Harry', as he became known, built his fortune on tapping into a perceived need for affordable apartment housing, particularly in the rush of post-war migrants from countries where inner-city apartment living was commonplace.

After floating Meriton on the Australian Securities Exchange in 1969, Triguboff bought back all the company's shares in 1973. Meriton has since remained a privately owned company, shielded from the vicissitudes of the global financial markets.

A downturn in the property market in the 1970s saw Meriton withdraw some of its apartments for sale, and rent them out instead. Residential leasing now forms an important aspect of its business. The other arms of Meriton include strata property management and property financing.

In 1984, Meriton expanded interstate to Queensland, with a  focus on Brisbane and the Gold Coast.

Properties

World Tower in Sydney, opened by Prime Minister John Howard, was completed in 2004 and is Sydney's tallest residential building.

The Soleil site in Adelaide Street was the company's first project in Brisbane.  The initial design was rejected by the Brisbane City Council because of design and potential traffic issues. The revised design later won an International Property Award for the Best Residential High-Rise Development in Australia.

Infinity Tower on Herschel Street, Brisbane, was completed in 2014 and was Brisbane's tallest building from 2014–2016.

Meriton Retail Precincts 
Meriton has a total of 7 shopping centres known as Meriton Retail Precinct. The majority of the precincts have Woolworths and Coles supermarkets as anchor tenants.

List of shopping centres

New South Wales 

 Bondi Junction
 Dee Why
 George Street (Sydney CBD)
 Mascot Central
 Parramatta (known as Dining Precinct)
 Waterloo

Queensland 

 Sundale

Awards

The company has received a number of awards.

2015 Urban Taskforce Development Excellence Award for Best Master Planned Community Awarded to ‘Epping Park’, Epping Park, NSW
2015 Property Council of Australia Innovation & Excellence Award for Best Residential Development Awarded to ‘VSQ North’, Zetland, NSW
2014 HIA-CSR NSW Housing Award for Best Apartment Complex over 10 storeys Awarded to ‘VSQ North’, Zetland, NSW
2014 HIA-Colorbond steel ‘Housing 100 Report’ – Australia's Number One Home Builder
2014 Urban Taskforce Development Excellence Award for High-Density Residential Development Awarded for ‘Infinity’, Herschel Street, Brisbane central business district
2014 Property Council of Australia Awards for Best Residential High Rise in Australia Awarded for Soleil, Adelaide Street, Brisbane
2014 NSW Architecture Awards for Residential Architecture Multiple Housing Commendation Awarded for Imperial, Campbell Street, Sydney central business district
International Property Awards 2013-2014 - Winner, Best Residential High Rise Development in Australia for Soleil on Adelaide Street. 
Urban Taskforce Residential Development Awards 2013 Winner - Residential Development Award for Soleil on Adelaide Street.
2012 HIA-CSR Award for Apartment Project 10 Storeys and Over, awarded for ‘Imperial', Haymarket, NSW 
2011 Urban Taskforce Development Excellence Award for Residential Apartments, awarded for 'Portia', Southport, Qld
2009 Urban Taskforce Development Excellence Award for Affordable Housing
2009 National Trust's Energy Australia Heritage Award for Conservation of Built Heritage, awarded for 'Crown Square', Waterloo, NSW
2003 Best New Building by The Sydney Magazine Readers Poll, awarded for World Tower, Sydney, NSW
2002 HIA Award for Australia's Number 1 Homebuilder
1998 Master Builders Association Award for Housing Contributions
1995 Master Builders Association Award for Excellence in Housing  
1992 Master Builders Association Award for Excellence in Housing 
1990 HIA Award for Top Homes

See also

List of companies of Australia

References

External links

Companies based in Sydney
Construction and civil engineering companies of Australia
Australian companies established in 1963
Construction and civil engineering companies established in 1963
Real estate and property developers
Australian brands
Apartment buildings in Australia
1963 establishments in Australia
Privately held companies of Australia